The reserves of the Government of Singapore is a collection of assets, after subtracting for liabilities, owned by the Government of Singapore and the entities listed in the fifth schedule of the Constitution, such as the Central Provident Fund (CPF), Housing and Development Board (HDB) and Temasek Holdings amongst others. This also includes the Official Foreign Reserves (OFR) accumulated by the Monetary Authority of Singapore (MAS) and the assets managed by GIC Private Limited (GIC). Liabilities held by the Government include MAS-issued bonds such as Singapore Government Securities (SGS) and Government-issued Special Singapore Government Securities (SSGS) that are exclusively purchased by CPF with monies from CPF account holders.

Regarding the relationship between the president and Government, the past reserves refers to a portion of the reserves that were not accumulated by the Government during its current term of office. The president's discretion to withhold assent to any transaction proposed by the Government or a fifth schedule entity that is likely to lead to a draw on the past reserves has been referred to as a "second key" and is meant to be an independent safeguard against a profligate and rogue government wanting to squander the country's hard-earned reserves.

However, the Government has maintained that it is not in the national interest to publish the full size of the reserves as doing so "will make it easier for markets to mount speculative attacks on the Singapore dollar during periods of vulnerability."

Structure and composition
The Government and each of the fifth schedule entities manage a portfolio of reserves under their charge for the benefit of the Government. These entities are divided into two parts where Part 1 of the fifth schedule comprise Key Statutory Boards that were created from and managed according to a statute passed by Parliament such as the Housing and Development Board whereas Part 2 contains Government companies that are structured and managed according to the Companies Act and on a private and commercial basis with the Government as the sole beneficial shareholder.

State Land is a visible example of a component of the Past Reserves. When the Housing and Development Board (HDB) purchases State Land for the purpose of building flats, the purchase price paid by HDB goes into the Past Reserves.

Another example can be found when Central Provident Fund (CPF) monies are used by the CPF Board to invest in the exclusive purchase of Government-issued Special Singapore Government Securities (SSGS), the proceeds from these purchases go into the Past Reserves.

Current Key Statutory Boards:

Central Provident Fund Board (CPF)
Housing and Development Board (HDB)
Jurong Town Corporation (JTC)
Monetary Authority of Singapore (MAS)

Past Key Statutory Boards:

Board of Commissioners of Currency, Singapore
Post Office Savings Bank of Singapore (POSB)

Current Government companies:

GIC Private Limited
Temasek Holdings (Private) Limited

Past Government companies:
MND Holdings (Private) Limited
Singapore Technologies Holdings Pte. Ltd.

Previous drawings on Past Reserves
On 9 March 2009, President S. R. Nathan assented to the Supplementary Supply (FY 2008) Act 2009 and the Supply Act 2009 after passage in the 11th Parliament and following its introduction by Minister for Finance Tharman Shanmugaratnam. The Acts respectively provided for a drawing on the Past Reserves of a sum not exceeding S$1.125 billion and S$3.763 billion (S$4.888 billion in total) to alleviate the adverse economic effects caused by the Financial crisis of 2007-2008.

On 9 April 2020, President Halimah Yacob assented to the Revised Supplementary Supply (FY 2020) Act 2020, also known as the "Resilience" and "Solidarity" Budgets, after passage in the 13th Parliament and following its introduction by Minister for Finance Heng Swee Keat. The Act provided for a drawing on the Past Reserves of a sum not exceeding S$20,999,600,000 to alleviate the adverse economic effects caused by the COVID-19 pandemic in Singapore.

On 16 June 2020, President Halimah Yacob assented to the Second Supplementary Supply (FY 2020) Act 2020, also known as the "Fortitude" Budget, after passage in the 13th Parliament and following its introduction by Minister for Finance Heng Swee Keat. The Act provided for a drawing on the Past Reserves of a sum not exceeding S$28,312,615,600 (S$49,312,215,600 in total after including the "Resilience" and "Fortitude" Budgets) to alleviate the adverse economic effects caused by the 2020-21 Singapore circuit breaker measures during the COVID-19 pandemic in Singapore.

On 16 March 2021, President Halimah Yacob assented to the Supply Act 2021 after passage in the 14th Parliament and following its introduction by Minister for Finance Heng Swee Keat. The Act provided for a drawing on the Past Reserves of a sum not exceeding S$11,010,000,000 to alleviate the continuing adverse economic effects caused by the COVID-19 pandemic in Singapore.

On 23 March 2022, President Halimah Yacob assented to the Supply Act 2022 after passage in the 14th Parliament and following its introduction by Minister for Finance Lawrence Wong. The Act provided for a drawing on the Past Reserves of a sum not exceeding S$6,000,000,000 to alleviate the continuing adverse economic effects caused by the COVID-19 pandemic in Singapore.

Controversies

President's access to information concerning the reserves

Soon after his election in 1993, President Ong Teng Cheong was tangled in a dispute over his access to information regarding the reserves. The Accountant-General said that it would take 56-man-years to produce a dollar-and-cents value of the immovable assets owned by the Government. The President discussed this with the Accountant-General and the Auditor-General and both  Accountant-General and the Auditor-General eventually conceded that the Government could easily declare all of its properties, a list that took a few months to produce. Even then, the list was not complete and it took the Government a total of three years to produce the information that the President requested.

In an interview with Asiaweek six months after stepping down from the presidency, Ong Teng Cheong indicated that he had asked for the audit based on the principle that as an elected president, he was bound to protect the Past Reserves, and the only way of doing so would be to know what reserves—both liquid cash and assets—the Government owned.

Approval of the Central Provident Fund's budget for the financial year of 1997

In November 1996, the Central Provident Fund's (CPF) budget for the upcoming financial year of 1997 was submitted to President Ong for routine approval. It contained a declaration by the CPF's Chairman and General Manager that this budget was not likely to draw on the Past Reserves of the CPF. The following month, the Council of Presidential Advisers (CPA) found that the budget showed a capital expenditure of S$27 million, which exceeded the operating surplus by S$4 million. This excess would require funding from the CPF's current reserves in the form of accumulated surpluses but with the impending dissolution of Parliament and the resulting end of the Government's current term of office prior to the 1997 Singaporean general election, all of the accumulated surpluses to date would become Past Reserves. Therefore, the CPA sought clarification from the Chairman and General Manager on the basis of their declaration "knowing full well that there will be a General Election soon".

The General Manager, Lim Han Soon, explained that the CPF's accounts were drafted on an accrual basis where capital expenditure is depreciated over the useful life of the asset, rather than in one lump sum in the year of expenditure. The operating surplus of S$23 million had already charged an annual depreciation of S$11 million against the projected income for 1997. Therefore, no draw on the Past Reserves would have occurred, irrespective of a general election.

In a letter to Prime Minister Goh Chok Tong dated 16 December, the President wrote that he would approve CPF's budget but with a gazette notification that the budget would likely draw on the Past Reserves following the "changeover of Government". The Prime Minister replied the next day with a repeat of the General Manager's explanation and a request that the President hold back the gazetting of his opinion. The Prime Minister also suggested that since there seemed to be a difference in the interpretation of the budget, "we should get the Accountant-General or the Auditor-General to state whether or not there would be a drawdown on reserves following the changeover of Government."

The President replied on 20 December with an agreement to hold back the gazetting of his opinion and his intention to withhold approval of the budget until the issue has been resolved. In reply to the Prime Minister's suggestion of seeking the views of the Accountant-General or the Auditor-General, the President wrote that "My duty does not include clarifying with the professional bodies the principles and interpretation. That duty lies with the Government." The President then explained his reservations about accrual accounting by writing that "My concern here is that this approach (i.e. accrual accounting) will allow a profligate Government to hide its lavish spending under the guise of capital expenditures. In the final analysis, it is the Government which would have to recommend whether this is a principle that should guide my actions. And in the absence of clearly enunciated and mutually agreed principles and procedures for dealing with such matters, I would rather err on the side of stringency. If the principles had been settled earlier, this uncertainty about what is or is not a draw would not have arisen."

The Government subsequently and explicitly reaffirmed "that statutory boards and Government companies should continue to prepare their accounts and budgets on an accrual basis."

After the 1997 Singaporean general election, the Prime Minister wrote to the President on 27 January 1997, seeking his agreement to accrual accounting while explaining the safeguards in place. The President replied on 30 January that he had approved the CPF's budget for 1997 and agreed to the principle of accrual accounting but he still maintained that "the concern that a profligate government could hide its lavish spending under the guise of capital expenditure was not fully addressed."

Sale of Post Office Savings Bank of Singapore to DBS

In 1998, President Ong found out, through the newspapers, that the Government intended to privatise Post Office Savings Bank and accept an offer by DBS Bank to acquire POSB and its subsidiaries. POSB was a Key Statutory Board whose Past Reserves came within the President's protection. The sale, according to the President, was procedurally inappropriate and did not recognise the President's significance as the guardian of the Past Reserves and he had to inform the Government of this oversight. Still, the sale proceeded with the removal of POSB from the fifth schedule of the Constitution and the removal of the requirement for a Minister to seek the President's concurrence when revoking the appointments of the Directors and the Chairman of the Board. The undertakings and employees of POSB were then transferred to DBS and the Post Office Savings Bank of Singapore Act was repealed.

Notes

References

External links

President of the Republic of Singapore

Council of Presidential Advisers

Cabinet of Singapore

Public finance of Singapore